Mike Beckham (born 22 May 1970, in Auckland, New Zealand) is a Cook Islands former international rugby union player for Glasgow Warriors at the Loosehead Prop position.

He was signed by Kevin Greene, the Glasgow coach, in 1997. Previously the time Beckham had a 9 to 5 job and was playing rugby for the New Zealand Army team. He was capped internationally by the Cook Islands.

He said of the move: "I came here to get a taste of European rugby. The opportunity came through Kevin Greene. I enjoyed the game against West Hartlepool at the weekend, despite a calf strain, and it was good to learn about the style of play. At home we have more short phases, we attack from anywhere and we bring it back to the pack when there is no way through."

As well as pre-season friendlies against West Hartlepool, Caledonia Reds and Brumbies, he played 4 times in the Heineken Cup for Glasgow in the 1997–98 season. He also played in the Scottish Inter-District Championship of that year against Caledonia Reds.

When not playing for the provincial Warriors side, Beckham played for the amateur side Glasgow Hawks. He scored a try for the Hawks side that beat Toulouse 37–15 on 20 February 1998. He was also part of the Hawks side that won the Scottish Cup and the then Scottish Division 2.

He signed for Leeds Tykes in 1998 the following season.

Beckham now works in logistics & operations and project management in New Zealand.

References

External links

Statbunker profile
Glasgow against Sale Sharks

Living people
Cook Island rugby union players
Glasgow Hawks players
Glasgow Warriors players
New Zealand sportspeople of Cook Island descent
Leeds Tykes players
Cook Islands international rugby union players
1970 births
Expatriate rugby union players in Scotland
New Zealand expatriate sportspeople in Scotland
Rugby union props
Rugby union players from Auckland